Anil Kumar is an Indian politician and member of the 18th Legislative Assembly of Uttar Pradesh. Kumar represented the Purqazi constituency of Uttar Pradesh and is a member of the Rashtriya Lok Dal.

Early life and education
Anil Kumar was born in Village Taharpur, Saharanpur district, Uttar Pradesh, on 25 November 1975. Kumar belongs to the SC category (Chamar). His education is intermediate. Before joining politics, he was an agriculturist.

Political career
Anil Kumar has been a MLA for three terms. He currently represents Purqazi (Assembly constituency) and is a member of Rashtriya Lok Dal.

Posts Held

See also

Bahujan Samaj Party
Politics of India
Purqazi (Assembly constituency)
Fifteenth Legislative Assembly of Uttar Pradesh
Sixteenth Legislative Assembly of Uttar Pradesh
Uttar Pradesh Legislative Assembly

References

Bahujan Samaj Party politicians from Uttar Pradesh
People from Muzaffarnagar district
1975 births
Living people
Uttar Pradesh MLAs 2017–2022
Uttar Pradesh MLAs 2012–2017
Uttar Pradesh MLAs 2007–2012
Samajwadi Party politicians
Rashtriya Lok Dal politicians